The following is the list of cities in Kazakhstan that underwent a name change in the past.

Yasi → Shavgar (?) → Turkestan (Kazakh: Түркістан) (?)
Novopetrovskoye → Fort Alexandrovsky (1857) → Fort-Shevchenko (1939)
Ayakoz → Sergiopol (1860) → Ayagoz (Kazakh: Аягөз) (1939)
Aktau → Shevchenko (1964) → Aktau (Kazakh: Ақтау) (1991)
Dzharkent → Panfilov (1942) → Zharkent (Kazakh: Жаркент) (1991)
Guryev → Atyrau (Kazakh: Атырау) (1991)
Yaitsk → Uralsk (1775) → Oral (Kazakh: Орал) (1991)
Verniy → Alma-Ata  (1921) → Almaty (Kazakh: Алматы) (1992)
Dzhezkazgan → Zhezkazgan (Kazakh: Жезқазған) (1992)
Novy Uzen → Zhanaozen (Kazakh: Жаңаөзен) (1992)
Ust-Kamennaya → Ust-Kamenogorsk (1868) → Oskemen (Kazakh: Өскемен) (1992)
Chu → Shu (Kazakh: Шу) (1992)
Yermak → Aksu (Kazakh: Ақсу) (1993)
Stanitsa Kokchetavskaya (1827–1868) → Kokchetav (1868–1993) → Kokshetau (Kazakh: Көкшетау) (1993)
Gavrilovka → Taldy-Kurgan (1920) → Taldykorgan (Kazakh: Талдықорған) (1993)
Chimkent → Shymkent (Kazakh: Шымкент) (1993)
Leninsk → Baikonur (Kazakh: Байқоңыр) (1995)
Ak-Mechet → Fort-Perovsky (1853) → Perovsk (1858) → Kyzyl-Orda (1925) → Kyzylorda (Kazakh: Қызылорда) (1996)
Alexeyevka → Akkol (Kazakh: Ақкөл) (1997)
Kustanay → Kostanay (Kazakh: Қостанай) (1997)
Talas → Aulie-Ata (1856) → Mirzoyan (1936) → Jambul (1938) → Zhambyl (1993) → Taraz (Kazakh: Тараз) (1997)
Aktyubinsk → Aktobe (Kazakh: Ақтөбе) (1999)
Ridder → Leningorsk (1941) → Ridder (Kazakh: Риддер) (2002)
Semipalatinsk → Semey (Kazakh: Семей) (2007)
Akmolinsk → Tselinograd (1961) → Akmola (1992) → Astana (Kazakh: Астана) (1998) → Nur-Sultan (Kazakh: Нұр-Сұлтан) (2019) → Astana (Kazakh: Астана) (2022)

See also
List of renamed cities in Kyrgyzstan
List of renamed cities in Tajikistan
List of renamed cities in Turkmenistan
List of renamed cities in Uzbekistan

 
Kazakhstan geography-related lists
Renamed, Kazakhstan
Kazakhstan, Renamed
Kazakhstan